The Ecclesiastical Province of Miami is a Catholic ecclesiastical province covering the U.S. state of Florida. Its metropolitan bishop is the Archbishop of Miami, head of the Archdiocese of Miami. The province additionally includes the suffragan dioceses of Orlando, Palm Beach, Pensacola-Tallahassee, St. Augustine, St. Petersburg, and Venice.

History

Pope Paul VI made Miami a metropolitan see in 1968.

Education
There were 218 Catholic schools in Florida in 2008. Elementary schools are accredited by the Florida Catholic Conference. Catholic high schools are accredited by the Southern Association of Colleges and Schools. In 2009, there were about 87,000 Catholic school students in Florida.

There were 35 secondary schools in Florida in 2009. They graduated 5,500 students.

Organizations
There were 49,000 Knights of Columbus in Florida in 2009.

Metropolitans
The following archbishops have served as Metropolitans of the Province:
 Archbishop Coleman Carroll (1968–1977) (had been bishop of Miami since 1958)
 Archbishop Edward Anthony McCarthy (1976–1994)
 Archbishop John Favalora 1994-2010
 Archbishop Thomas Wenski 2010 - current

See also
List of the Catholic bishops of the United States
List of the Catholic cathedrals of the United States
List of the Catholic dioceses of the United States
Bishop (Catholic Church)
Catholic Church hierarchy
Roman Catholicism in the United States
Catholicism and American politics
History of Roman Catholicism in the United States
Catholic Church by country
Christianity in the United States
United States Conference of Catholic Bishops

Footnotes

 
Miami